Paolo Benanti (Rome, 20 July 1973) is an Italian presbyter, theologian and academic of the Third Order Regular of St. Francis. He teaches at the Pontifical Gregorian University and is advisor to Pope Francis on issues of artificial intelligence and technology ethics.

Biography 
Born in Rome on July 20, 1973, son of engineer Angelo Benanti and teacher Andreina Albani. In 1986 his family moved to Frascati, a comune in Lazio.

After having matured his vocation, in 1999 he left the university and entered the Third Regular Order of Saint Francis, in the convent of Massa Martana, where he spent the probationary year and the novitiate. On September 16, 2001, he got his Franciscan habit. He was ordained a priest on May 23, 2009. He served as the first councilor general and prosecutor general of the Order for the six-year period 2013–2019. In his baccalaureate studies in theology at the Theological Institute of Assisi (2001-2006) he had as a teacher the moralist Giovanni Cappelli.

At the Pontifical Gregorian University he obtained his licentiate in 2008 and his doctorate in moral theology in 2012. His doctoral thesis is entitled The Cyborg. Corpo e corporeità nell'epoca del postumano, (Cyborgs, Body and corporeality in the posthuman era) and won the Belarmino - Vedovato Award as the best doctoral thesis in public and social ethics in 2012.

In 2013 and 2014 attended The Intensive Bioethics Course at the Joseph P. and Rose F. Kennedy Institute of Ethics of the Georgetown University.

Since 2008 works as a professor at the Pontifical Gregorian University, the Theological Institute of Assisi and at the Pontifical College Leoni d'Anagni. In addition to the institutional courses on sexual morality and bioethics,he deals with neuroethics, technology ethics, artificial intelligence and posthuman intelligence. From 2015 he tries to apply and develop an ethical framework for artificial intelligences by developing the concepts of algorithm and algocracy. From 2020 in collaboration with Sebastiano Maffettone, political philosopher, he explores the vital, relational, social and communicative, labor and economic dimension, seen as the result of an interaction, with complex ethical implications, between the resources offered by the virtual and interactive reality and social and individual existence. This path leads him to the recognition of the creation of a hybrid reality, between utopia and dystopia, which takes the name of paraferno. These concepts are studied in depth through a series of editorials jointly signed between the two authors published in the Italian newspaper Corriere della sera.

In 2018 Vincenzo Paglia named him a corresponding member of the Pontifical Academy for Life with a particular mandate for the world of artificial intelligence.

In February 2019, he was appointed Provincial Minister of the Religious Province of Saint Francis of Assisi of the Third Regular Order of Saint Francis after an assembly convened in Assisi.

On November 4, 2019, Pope Francis appointed him Councilor of the Apostolic Penitentiary (the oldest dicastery of the Curia and the first of the tribunals of the Roman Curia. On November 11, 2019, the Pontiff appointed him Consultant of the Pontifical Council for Culturewhose regent is Cardinal Gianfranco Ravasi and which aims to "foster relations between the Holy See and the world of culture, especially promoting dialogue with different cultures" of our time, so that the civilization of man is more and more open to the Gospel, and that lovers of science, literature and the arts feel recognized by the Church as people at the service of the true, of the good and beautiful".

On February 12, 2021, he was appointed by Pope Francis as an ordinary member of the Pontifical Academy for Life.

Works 
Human in the loop. Decisioni umane e intelligenze artificiali, Mondadori Università, Milano, 2022
La grande invenzione. Il linguaggio come tecnologia, dalle pitture rupestri al GPT-3, San Paolo, Cinisello Balsamo, 2021
Vedere l'alba dentro l'imbrunire. Scenari plausibili dopo il COVID-19, Castelvecchi, 2020
Ricordare troppo. Eccessi di memoria da Borges alle neuroscienze, Marietti, 2020
Digital Age. Teoria del cambio d'epoca. Persona, famiglia e società, San Paolo 2020
Oráculos: entre ética e governança dos algoritmos, Editora Unisinos, 2020
Se l’uomo non basta. Speranze e timori nell’uso della tecnologia contro il Covid-19, Castelvecchi, 2020.
Homo Faber. The Techno-Human condition, EDB, 2018.
 Realtà sintetica. Dall'aspirina alla vita: come ricreare il mondo?, Castelvecchi, 2018.
 Le macchine sapienti, Marietti, 2018.
 Oracoli. Tra algoretica e algocrazia, Luca Sossela Editore, 2018.
 Postumano, troppo postumano. Neurotecnologie e human enhancement, Castelvecchi, 2017.
 L'hamburger di Frankenstein. La rivoluzione della carne sintetica, EDB, 2017.
 Ti esti? Prima lezione di bioetica, Cittadella, 2016.
 La condizione tecno-umana. Domande di senso nell’era della tecnologia, EDB, 2016.
 Amerai!, Cittadella, 2014.
 Massimo Reichlin – Paolo Benanti, Il doping della mente. Le sfide del potenziamento cognitivo farmacologico, Messaggero, 2014.
 The Cyborg: corpo e corporeità nell’epoca del postumano, Cittadella, 2012.
 Vivere il morire. Spunti per l’antropologia biomedica, Cittadella, 2009.

References 

Italian theologians
1973 births
Living people